Mary Ann Baker (16 September 1832–29 September 1925) was an American composer and singer. She was an active member of a Baptist congregation. She is known for her temperance songs.

Master, the tempest is raging 
"Master the Tempest is Raging" was composed by Baker and H. R. Palmer. In 1874 Baker was commissioned by Dr. Palmer to compose a song related to the biblical verses about "Jesus Stilling the Tempest". 

Having recently lost her brother to tuberculosis, Mary used her experience of frustration and reconciliation as inspiration to compose the words of the hymn.

As related to Ira D. Sankey:

Baker and Palmer's hymn enjoyed some moderate appeal amongst religious schools and churches. Almost two decades later Baker reflected on a new political connection for her composition:

During the 20th Century, the hymn gained lasting popularity, appearing in more than 254 hymnals to date

Works
Among the main hymns she composed are:

 "Master, the tempest is raging!"
 "Satan the seed is sowing"
 "Chained by sin in cruel bondage"
 "Why perish with cold and with hunger?"

References

 Center for Church Music. http://www.songsandhymns.org/hymns/detail/away-in-a-manger

External links

 
 Baker, Mary Ann on Hymnary.org
 Master, the Tempest is Raging on HymnTime
 The story of Master, the Tempest is Raging

1832 births
1925 deaths
American Christian hymnwriters
American performers of Christian music
American music publishers (people)
19th-century American writers
People from Chicago
Songwriters from Illinois